This is a list of listed buildings in Faxe Municipality, Denmark.

List

4640 Faxe

4653 Karise

4690 Haslev

References

External links

 Danish Agency of Culture

 
Faxe